Shamshabad ( in Iran may refer to:
Shamshabad, Chaharmahal and Bakhtiari
Shamshabad, Kerman

See also
Shamshabad